Trevor Donald Oldham (10 March 1900 – 2 May 1953) was an Australian politician, who was the leader of the Liberal Party in the state of Victoria from 1952 until his death in 1953. The eldest of three sons born to Arthur and Ethel Oldham, he was educated at Melbourne Church of England Grammar School and the University of Melbourne. He had enlisted in the Australian Imperial Force on 7 November 1918, four days before the Armistice.

He married Kathleen Cooch in 1929.

Business career
Oldham graduated in law at Melbourne University in 1921, and practised as a solicitor until the weight of parliamentary duties limited his time.  He was a past president of the Royal Victoria Eye and Ear Hospital and a former deputy chancellor of  Melbourne University.

Oldham was a former director of Henry Berry & Co., Hoadley Chocolates Ltd, Ruskins Motor Bodys Ltd, and Ensign Dry Cleaners Ltd.

Political career
Oldham entered parliament in 1933 as a member of the United Australia Party. He won the seat of Boroondara and held it until the seat was divided in 1945. When the UAP was re-formed as the Liberal Party in 1945, Oldham won the seat of Malvern. He served as Attorney-General and Solicitor-General of Victoria in Thomas Hollway's first government in 1947, and also served as Deputy Premier of Victoria for eight months before the Liberals lost office to a Country Party and Labor Party alliance in 1950.

In 1951, Les Norman replaced Hollway as Liberal leader, after the party became lukewarm about Hollway's plan of reforming Victoria's malapportioned electoral boundaries. In a provocative move, Hollway contested Norman's urban-based seat of Glen Iris at the 1952 election and won. With their leader having been defeated, the Liberal Party elected Oldham as leader and Henry Bolte as deputy leader.

Death
Oldham and his wife were killed in a plane crash in India on 2 May 1953, on their way to England to attend the coronation of Queen Elizabeth II. The BOAC Comet they were travelling in broke up mid-air a few minutes after leaving Calcutta (now Kolkata), amid severe thunderstorms and torrential rain.

Indian authorities arranged a communal burial in Calcutta of all the victims of the Comet crash. A memorial service was held at St Paul's Cathedral, Melbourne, on 6 May 1953.

The Oldhams were survived by their three children, James 10, Byrony 8 and Kristin 6.

References

 

|-

1900 births
1953 deaths
Liberal Party of Australia members of the Parliament of Victoria
Members of the Victorian Legislative Assembly
Politicians from Melbourne
Deputy Premiers of Victoria
Leaders of the Opposition in Victoria (Australia)
Attorneys-General of Victoria
Solicitors-General of Victoria
Melbourne Law School alumni
Victims of aviation accidents or incidents in India
Australian solicitors
20th-century Australian politicians
People from St Kilda, Victoria
People educated at Melbourne Grammar School